The Dr. Robert W. Bandy House is a historic house in Gleason, Tennessee, USA.

History
The two-story brick house was completed in 1907. It was designed in the American Foursquare architectural style. It was built for Dr Robert W. Bandy, a physician and businessman.

The house was purchased by Robert Jeter, a surgeon, in 1941.

Architectural significance
It has been listed on the National Register of Historic Places since August 9, 1984.

References

Houses on the National Register of Historic Places in Tennessee
American Foursquare architecture in Tennessee
Houses completed in 1907
Houses in Weakley County, Tennessee
National Register of Historic Places in Weakley County, Tennessee